WCFM (91.9 FM) is a radio station broadcasting a Variety format. Licensed to Williamstown, Massachusetts, United States.  The station is owned by Williams College. Shows are run by students, faculty and Williamstown community members.

References

External links

CFM
Williams College
Mass media in Berkshire County, Massachusetts
Radio stations established in 1958
1958 establishments in Massachusetts